Dean W. McAmmond (born June 15, 1973) is a Canadian former professional ice hockey player. McAmmond played in the National Hockey League from 1992 to 2010 for nine teams.

Pre-NHL career
McAmmond played four seasons in the Western Hockey League with the Prince Albert Raiders and the Swift Current Broncos. During the 1992–93 WHL playoffs, he scored a league high 16 goals in 17 playoff games to help lead the Swift Current Broncos to the league championship. He would net 431 total points while with the Raiders. In 1993, McAmmond captured a gold medal as a member of Team Canada at the IIHF World Junior Championships in Sweden.

NHL career

Early years
A first-round selection by the Chicago Blackhawks in the 1991 NHL Entry Draft (22nd overall), McAmmond made his NHL debut with the Blackhawks during the 1991–92 season. On February 24, 1993, Chicago traded McAmmond, along with Igor Kravchuk, to the Edmonton Oilers for Joe Murphy. McAmmond spent the better part of six seasons in the Oilers organization from 1993 to 1998, including two stints with Edmonton's AHL affiliate Cape Breton Oilers. During his time in Edmonton, McAmmond also represented his native Canada at the 1996 World Championships in Austria, winning a silver medal. After dressing in over 300 games with the Oilers, his longest tenure with any NHL club, Edmonton sent the Alberta native back to Chicago with Jonas Elofsson and Boris Mironov on March 20, 1999 to the Blackhawks for Ethan Moreau, Chad Kilger, Daniel Cleary and Christian Laflamme. McAmmond once again represented Canada during the 2000 World Championships in Russia.

Calgary and Colorado
After playing the better part of two seasons in Chicago, the Blackhawks traded McAmmond again on March 13, 2001 to the Philadelphia Flyers for a third-round selection in the 2001 NHL Entry Draft. After finishing the season in Philadelphia, the Flyers traded McAmmond during the offseason to the Calgary Flames for a fourth-round selection in the 2002 NHL Entry Draft. McAmmond then signed a multi-year contract with the Flames in August, 2001.

Upon returning to Alberta, McAmmond enjoyed a career year with the Flames during the 2001–02 season, setting personal highs for goals (21) and points (51) in 73 games.  On October 1, 2002, prior to the beginning of the 2002–03 NHL season, Calgary traded McAmmond with Jeff Shantz and Derek Morris to the Colorado Avalanche for Stéphane Yelle and Chris Drury.  In the midst of an injury-filled season with the Avalanche, Calgary re-acquired McAmmond from Colorado on March 11, 2003 for a fifth-round selection in the 2003 NHL Entry Draft.  McAmmond, however, couldn't play a game for the Flames for the rest of the season since the deal violated a rule at the time prohibiting teams from trading a player prior to the waiver draft and reacquiring them later in the year.  McAmmond suffered another setback during the 2003–04 season with Calgary, sustaining a back injury and missing the remaining 13 games of the regular season and every game of the 2004 Stanley Cup Playoffs during Calgary's run to game seven of the 2004 Stanley Cup Final.

Later years

During the 2004–05 NHL lockout, McAmmond played for the American Hockey League's Albany River Rats, leading the team in scoring with 61 points (19 goals, 42 assists) in 79 games.  When NHL play resumed, and as an unrestricted free agent, McAmmond signed a contract to play with the St. Louis Blues for the 2005-2006 season, where he tallied 15 goals and 37 points in 78 games.  Following the season, McAmmond, again a free agent signed with the Ottawa Senators 2006-2007 NHL season.

In Ottawa, McAmmond emerged as a dependable role player on a skilled Senator team.  In the 2007 Senators Super Skills competition, McAmmond led the Senators as the fastest skater, and later, on March 30, 2007, he played his 800th career NHL game in a winning effort against the Montreal Canadiens. McAmmond recorded a Gordie Howe hat trick on April 15, 2007, in a playoff game against the Pittsburgh Penguins, scoring a goal, adding an assist, and winning a fight with Pittsburgh's Maxime Talbot.  The Senators rolled into the 2007 Stanley Cup Final, only to lose the series in five games to the Anaheim Ducks. In game three, after scoring what turned out to be the game-winning goal (and the only win in the series) for Ottawa, McAmmond was the victim of a controversial elbow to the head from defenceman Chris Pronger. He left the ice with assistance and did not return for games four or five, suffering from a concussion.

Just a few months after re-signing a multi-year contract with Ottawa, McAmmond suffered another concussion during a preseason game on September 25, 2007 from a hit to the head by Philadelphia's Steve Downie. McAmmond, knocked unconscious by the hit, was carried off the ice by stretcher. Downie, who received a match penalty for the hit, was suspended for 20 games by the NHL for the incident. After missing 10 games from the hit, McAmmond returned to the Senator line-up in November and finished the 2007-2008 season without any further injuries.

In the midst of the 2008-2009 NHL Season that saw McAmmond miss several games due to pneumonia, Ottawa sent him to the New York Islanders along with a first-round selection (acquired from San Jose) in the 2009 NHL Entry Draft in exchange for Mike Comrie and Chris Campoli on February 20, 2009. McAmmond, who grew up as an Islanders fan in Alberta, enjoyed a short stint on Long Island before becoming an unrestricted free agent at season's end.

After going uncontacted by an NHL team over the 2009 summer, the New Jersey Devils came calling and on October 20, McAmmond signed an AHL contract to play with the Lowell Devils, returning for a second stint with the New Jersey Devils minor league affiliate. On November 6, after suffering numerous injuries to the team, the Devils and McAmmond agreed to a two-way contract which brought him up to the Devils roster.  Devils coach Jacques Lemaire used McAmmond as a defensive specialist, killing penalties, while also seeing time on the power play.

McAmmond's last involvement in the NHL came with the attempt to make a return to the New York Islanders roster for the 2010–11 season. After accepting an invitation to training camp he was subsequently released at its conclusion. McAmmond finished only four appearances shy of 1,000 career NHL games.

Career statistics

Regular season and playoffs

International

Awards and honours

References

External links

 
Yahoo Sports

1973 births
Albany River Rats players
Calgary Flames players
Canadian ice hockey left wingers
Cape Breton Oilers players
Chicago Blackhawks draft picks
Chicago Blackhawks players
Colorado Avalanche players
Edmonton Oilers players
Ice hockey people from Alberta
Living people
National Hockey League first-round draft picks
New Jersey Devils players
New York Islanders players
Ottawa Senators players
Philadelphia Flyers players
Prince Albert Raiders players
St. Louis Blues players
Swift Current Broncos players